A Lively Christmas Eve (German: Ach, du fröhliche...; literally, Oh, You Merry One...) is an East German comedy Christmas film, directed by Günter Reisch. It was released in 1962.

Plot
Dresden, Christmas Eve. Veteran communist and factory director Walter Lörke is told by his daughter Anne that she became pregnant by a young man named Thomas Ostermann, whom she intends to marry. Thomas is revealed to be a sharp critic of the government. Enraged, Walter leaves the house. Outside, he begins to inquire about his would-be son-in-law. After a clumsy voyage in the streets of the city, during which he encounters many absurd phenomena, he discovers that Thomas had a friend whose parents escaped to West Germany. The friend was ostracized by society, but Thomas did not shun him, and was therefore barred from entering university. Walter returns home and talks to Thomas, who realizes that although he suffered injustices, he remains true to the ideals of the party. The two reconcile.

Cast
Erwin Geschonneck - Walter Lörke
Mathilde Danegger - grandmother
Karin Schröder	- Anne Lörke
Arno Wyzniewski - Thomas Ostermann
Günter Junghans - Karl Lörke
Rosemarie Schelenz - Peggy
Herwart Grosse	 - Mr. Ostermann
Marianne Wünscher - Mrs. Klinkhöfer
Walter Jupé - Mr. Klinkhöfer
Karla Runkehl - Mr. Siebkorn
Fred Delmare -	taxi driver
Gerd Ehlers - drunken butcher
Walter E. Fuß	- Professor Flimrich
Horst Giese - Gisse

Production
The film was part of a wave of comedies, relatively free from political restrictions, that were produced by DEFA at the early 1960s. At the time, the anti-Stalinist approach espoused by the Soviet Union allowed a more relaxed cultural climate, that came to an end in the 1965 XI Plenum of the Socialist Unity Party of Germany. The script was adapted from a Czechoslovak play; director Günter Reisch received the authorization to make the picture after using the influence of the leading actor Erwin Geschonneck on the members of the State Cinema Committee.

Reception
The German Film Lexicon defined Ach, du Fröhliche... as a "better than average comedy, with barbed satire against dogmatic beliefs... with brilliant acting".

East German cinema expert Joshua Feinstein wrote that the film was one of the "more outlandish" made at the time, that reminded him of Guess Who's Coming to Dinner. He also noted that it was the only pre-1989 East German picture to make a satirical reference to the Stasi.

Joe Perry, who researched the Christmas costumes in Germany, considered Ach, du Fröhliche... as an example to the SED's attempt to uphold the holiday's traditions as a time of familial bonding while completely rejecting any religious connotation. A "Socialist miracle" of reconciliation between oneself and the leading ideology replaced the Christian-inspired one. The film presented the Christmas costumes of East Germany, that were a readjustment of the old tradition: the fir tree, for example, was decorated by little sputniks. Perry interpreted the film as a typical "happy end Christmas story" with a communist setting.

See also
 List of Christmas films

References

External links
 
Ach du fröhliche... on PROGRESS.
Ach du fröhliche... on DEFA Sternstunden.
Ach du fröhliche... on cinema.de.

1962 films
East German films
1960s German-language films
1960s Christmas comedy films
1960s Christmas films
German Christmas comedy films
Films directed by Günter Reisch
Films set in Dresden
1960s German films